The Milwaukee River is a river in the state of Wisconsin. Once a locus of industry, the river is now the center of a housing boom. New condos now crowd the downtown and harbor districts of Milwaukee attracting young professionals to the area. The river is also ribboned with parks as it winds through various neighborhoods. Kayaks and fishing boats share the river with party boats. An extensive Riverwalk featuring art displays, boat launches and restaurants lines its banks in downtown Milwaukee.

Description 
The river begins in Fond du Lac County, Wisconsin and flows south past Grafton to downtown Milwaukee, where it empties into Lake Michigan.  Cedar Creek, the Menomonee River and the Kinnickinnic River are the three main tributaries.

Watershed 

The Milwaukee River watershed drains  in southeastern Wisconsin, including parts of Dodge, Fond du Lac, Milwaukee, Ozaukee, Sheboygan, Washington and Waukesha counties.

The Milwaukee River watershed is part of the Lake Michigan subbasin; this subbasin is itself a part of the St. Lawrence River Watershed, which is fed by the Great Lakes.

History 
The Milwaukee River area was populated by Native Americans in the time before European settlement.  Jacques Marquette and Louis Jolliet navigated from Lake Michigan through the Milwaukee River on their way to the Fox River and the Mississippi. Previously (circa 1834-35) the river had been known as the "Maynawalky," while the present-day Menomonee River was known as the "Milwalky".

In the early 19th century, three towns were formed across the banks of the Milwaukee and Kinnickinnic rivers: Juneautown by Solomon Juneau, Walker's Point by George H. Walker and Kilbourntown by Byron Kilbourn.  The quarrel over the formation of a bridge across the Milwaukee River was a key point in the merging of the three towns into the city of Milwaukee in 1846.

Bridges 

The Milwaukee River has numerous movable bridges spanning it, allowing for pedestrian and vehicular traffic. These bridges include several different types, including bascule and hydraulically-powered table bridges.  There are also many fixed bridges, as well as several pedestrian-only and railroad trestles.

The following is a partial list of bridges that cross the river, from north to south:
 Brown Deer Road Bridge
 Range Line Road Bridge
 Good Hope Road Bridge
 Green Tree Road Bridge
 Bender Road Bridge
 Silver Spring Drive Bridge
 Hampton Avenue Bridge
 I-43 Bridge
 Port Washington Road Bridge
 Capitol Drive Bridge
 Locust Street Bridge
 North Avenue Bridge (Milwaukee)|North Avenue Bridge
 North-Humboldt Pedestrian Bridge
 Humboldt Street Bridge
 Holton Street Viaduct (1926)
 Pleasant Street Bridge
 Cherry Street Bridge
 McKinley Avenue Bridge aka Knapp Street Bridge
 Juneau Avenue Bridge
 Highland Avenue Pedestrian Bridge
 State Street Bridge (Milwaukee)|State Street Bridge
 Kilbourn Avenue Bridge
 Wells Street Bridge (Milwaukee)|Wells Street Bridge
 Wisconsin Avenue Bridge
 Michigan Street Bridge
 Clybourn Street Bridge
 I-794 Bridge
 Saint Paul Avenue Bridge
 Water Street Bridge
 Broadway Bridge aka Milwaukee Street Bridge
 Hoan Bridge

There are also several Union Pacific (former Chicago and North Western Railway) railroad bridges crossing the Milwaukee River, including:
 north of Bender Road
 south of Silver Spring Drive
 Railroad Swing Bridge #1556 (1915)

Parks

Dams

See also 
 List of Wisconsin rivers
 Milwaukee Riverwalk

References

External links 

 Milwaukee River Advocates
 Milwaukee River Basin – Wisconsin DNR
 Milwaukee Green Map: Watersheds
 Milwaukee River Preservation Association
 Milwaukee Riverkeeper
 River Revitalization Foundation
 Milwaukee River Basin Partnership
 Milwaukee Estuary Area of Concern
 History of Port of Milwaukee
 Milwaukee River Greenway Coalition

Rivers of Wisconsin
Rivers of Fond du Lac County, Wisconsin
Rivers of Washington County, Wisconsin
Rivers of Ozaukee County, Wisconsin
Rivers of Milwaukee County, Wisconsin
Geography of Milwaukee
Tributaries of Lake Michigan